Alderman Samuel Gardiner MBE JP (24 March 1940 – 8 November 2022) was a Northern Irish Ulster Unionist Party (UUP) politician who was a Member of the Northern Ireland Assembly (MLA) for Upper Bann from 2003 to 2016.

Gardiner was elected to Lurgan Borough Council (now Craigavon Borough Council) in 1963 and held office of mayor in that borough in 1968. He was mayor of Craigavon 1982/3, 1988/9 and 2000/1.

Gardiner was elected to the Northern Ireland Forum and was party whip in the same in 1996–1998.

Gardiner was elected to the Assembly in 2003. He served on the Environmental, Leisure Services and Public Services Liaison Committees and was the UUP spokesperson on environment. As the oldest Northern Ireland Assembly member, Gardiner also served as Father of the House, a role which includes presiding over the election of a new Speaker of the Assembly.

Gardiner was a High Sheriff for County Armagh and was appointed a justice of the peace. He was also a member of the Orange Order, Deputy Sovereign Grand Master of the Royal Black Institution and former chairman of Glenavon F.C..

Gardiner died on 8 November 2022, at the age of 82.

References

External links
 Profile on the UUP website
 Stratagem profile
 NI Assembly profile

1940 births
2022 deaths
People from Lurgan
Members of the Order of the British Empire
Mayors of Craigavon
Ulster Unionist Party MLAs
Members of the Northern Ireland Forum
Northern Ireland MLAs 2003–2007
Northern Ireland MLAs 2007–2011
Northern Ireland MLAs 2011–2016
British football chairmen and investors
High Sheriffs of Armagh